Bonfim Paulista is a district of the city of Ribeirão Preto. It is located at 16km from the district center and 299km from São Paulo. It has 20,000 inhabitants. Its neighboring cities are Cravinhos and Guatapará.

History 
It was founded on February 10, 1894, being official on October 3, 1902, but the settlement already existed since 1850.

In 1906 the first school was built and inaugurated the sub-town-hall, being José Luciano de Andrade, the first sub-mayor.
Also in 1906, the first Telephonic Center was installed in Bonfim Square.

Old Denominations 
 Viaducto (Viaduct)
 Gaturamo
 Vila Bonfim (Bonfim Village)
 Bonfim Paulista

Curiosities 
 It has already did part of São Simão city.
 The first train came to Vila Bonfim on February 10, 1896.

Notable people 

 Cel. Américo Baptista da Costa - farmer
 Cel. Emílio Moreno de Alagão - farmer
 Cel. Furquim - farmer
 João Pedro da Veiga Miranda - engineer and skilful politician (was alderman, Ribeirão Preto mayor in 1908, state deputy and federal deputy, and finally Navy Minister from 1922 to 1924).
 Dr. Francisco Cunha Junqueira - politician (Agriculture Secretary in 1928).
 Da. Iria Alves da Cunha Junqueira - farmer (she had one of the biggest coffee farms in the beginning of the 20th century).

References

External links
 Administração Regional de Bonfim Paulista
 Bonfim Paulista (não-official)
 Estrada de ferro Bonfim Paulista (demolida)

Populated places in São Paulo (state)
Populated places established in 1894